Topside is a 2020 American drama film written and directed by Celine Held and Logan George. It stars Zhaila Farmer, Celine Held, Jared Abrahamson, and Fatlip. The film premiered at the Venice Film Festival in September 2020. It was released in the United States on March 25, 2022, by Vertical Entertainment.

Synopsis
In New York City, a mother and daughter live in abandoned subway tunnels underneath the city. When events force them elsewhere, they flee aboveground where they confront a difficult night in wintertime.

Cast
 Zhaila Farmer as Little
 Celine Held as Nikki
 Jared Abrahamson as Les
 Fatlip as John
 Cynthia Tombros as Lolly
 George Doerner
 Tarra Riggs
 Kevin Tanski as Tunnel Policeman
 Daria Somers

Release
The film premiered at the Venice Film Festival in September 2020.  Then it made its U.S. premiere at the South by Southwest, where it won the Jury Award for Best Director. In February 2022, Vertical Entertainment acquired the film's distribution rights.

Reception
On the review aggregator website Rotten Tomatoes, 73% of 15 reviews are positive, with an average rating of 7.1/10.

Sheri Linden of The Hollywood Reporter called it "A striking debut, cinematic and affecting." Eric Kohn of IndieWire wrote, "The whole concept of a lo-fi New York movie shot on the streets has been done and redone so many times that it risks cliché, but Topside works as well it does because it never tries to reinvent that playbook."

Brian Tallerico of RogerEbert.com gave the film a negative review and wrote, "Everyone here means well, and there’s a commitment to the entire venture that’s admirable, but this falls deep into what is often referred to as “poverty porn,” something that feels more manipulative in its depiction of misery than genuinely empathetic or artistic."

References

External links
 
 

American drama films
2020 drama films
2020s English-language films
2020s American films
Films about mother–daughter relationships
Films about homelessness
Films about children
Films set in New York City
Films about poverty in the United States